In Greek mythology, Antimache (Ancient Greek: Ἀντιμάχη) was the queen of Tiryns as wife of King Eurystheus, who tasked Heracles with his Labors.

Mythology 
Antimache was of Arcadian descent as the daughter of Amphidamas and the sister of Melanion, husband of the heroine Atalanta. Together with her husband Eurystheus, Antimache bore the following children: Admete, Alexander, Iphimedon, Eurybius, Mentor, Perimedes, and possibly, Eurypylus. All of her sons were killed in battle by the Athenians in the war that ensued when Athens refused to deliver the Heracleidae up to Eurystheus. Alternatively, during a sacrificial meal in honor of his Twelve Labors being completed, Heracles himself slain Antimache's children: Eurybius, Perimedes and Eurypylus when they served him a smaller portion of meat than they did for themselves.

Antimache appears in the 2014 film Hercules, played by Barbara Palvin.

Notes 

Queens in Greek mythology
Arcadian mythology
Mythology of Argolis

References 

 Apollodorus, The Library with an English Translation by Sir James George Frazer, F.B.A., F.R.S. in 2 Volumes, Cambridge, MA, Harvard University Press; London, William Heinemann Ltd. 1921. ISBN 0-674-99135-4. Online version at the Perseus Digital Library. Greek text available from the same website.
 Athenaeus of Naucratis, The Deipnosophists or Banquet of the Learned. London. Henry G. Bohn, York Street, Covent Garden. 1854. Online version at the Perseus Digital Library.
 Athenaeus of Naucratis, Deipnosophistae. Kaibel. In Aedibus B.G. Teubneri. Lipsiae. 1887. Greek text available at the Perseus Digital Library.